The Tenerife Ladies Open was a women's professional golf tournament on the Ladies European Tour, held on the Spanish island of Tenerife. The 72-hole event was played annually from 2002 to 2011; the format was modified in 2011 to a hybrid of stroke and match play. The results from the pro-am set the seeding for the field of 32, then two rounds of match play to reduce to eight finalists, with a final round of stroke play.

Winners

References

External links

Ladies European Tour

Former Ladies European Tour events
Golf tournaments in Spain
Sport in Tenerife
Recurring sporting events established in 2002
Recurring sporting events disestablished in 2011
2002 establishments in Spain
2011 disestablishments in Spain